Mitin Masi is a fictional Bengali female detective character created by Suchitra Bhattacharya.

Character
Suchitra Bhattacharya created detective fictions about Mitin mainly for teenagers, although wrote some stories of Mitin for adults. The real name of Mitin Masi is Pragyaparamita Mukherjee. She is in her mid 30s, lives in Dhakuria, Kolkata with her husband, Partha and son, Bumbum, and likes to cook. Mitin works as a private detective, who likes to use her mind rather than her revolver. She has a detective agency called the Third Eye. Oindrilla, popularly known as Tupur, is her niece. Tupur is a school student who assists her in many of her cases. Suchitra Bhattacharya writes many of the stories with a background of travelling to different places in India, and along with her mysteries, she also inculcates some knowledge of the culture of a particular place in her stories. Mitin's sister Saheli and her husband Aboni, Tupur's parents, are present in many of her adventures.

Stories
Most of the stories of Mitin Masi were published in Pujabarshiki Anandamela, which include:
 Saranday Shoytan - The gang go to Saranda, in Jharkhand for a vacation and get entangled in a poaching case.
 Jonathaner Barir Vut - Mysterious supernatural occurrings at an elderly Christian man, Jonathan's house causes Mitin to jump on the case with full vigour.
 Keralay Kistimaat - The gang's vacation to Kerala takes an exciting spin when a centuries—old scroll goes missing right in front of them.
 Sarpa Rahasya Sundarbone - The mysterious disappearance of a scientist working on a cure for cancer sends Mitin and Tupur diving into adventure.
 Jhao Jhiyen Hatya Rahasya - Tupur's Chinese friend thinks his uncle's death had some foul play; it's up to Mitin to uncover the truth.
 Chhokta Sudoku'r - When Partha wins a free trip to Singapore, the gang are over the moon. But there is a dark secret behind the glamorous invitation.
 Arakiyeler Hire - A diamond of Arakiyel family goes missing after the death of the family patriarch. Mitin and Tupur goes to investigate.
 Guptadhaner Gujab - An age—old house on the banks of the Ganges creates suspicion about a hidden treasure. But is it really treasure or some other form of mystery?
 Hate Matro Tinte Din - The only child of a rich Parsi businessman goes missing. Mitin comes to the scene to solve the mystery within 72 hours.
 Kurie Paoa Pendrive - A family trip to Himachal Pradesh turns into an adventure when Mitin learns about the theft of famous paintings.
 Marquis Strete Mirtyufand - A so–called natural death of some Jewish men and women creates a nuisance. Are those deaths really natural or is there some foul play?
 Tikorparay Gharial - A peaceful vacation turns into a hair-raising escapade after the disappearance of two gharials (a breed of crocodile) from a sanctuary.
 Duswapno Barbar - A story of Tupur's classmate Shalini who is plagued with recurring nightmares. Can Mitin find out the reason behind these nightmares?
 Sanders Saheber pnuthi - Mitin and gang went to Zanskar and Ladakh in search of Debal and a rare buddhist manuscript.

Apart from these, Suchitra Bhattacharya also wrote six adult detective stories of Mitin Masi namely:

Ekta Shudhu Wrong - Mitin caught a drug paddling gang only through a wrong number.

Bish - An extramarital affair of a woman with her son in law compelles her daughter to poison her mother to death.

Trishna Mara Geche - An innocent girl attempted suicide after being rigorously blackmailed by a notorious man. Armed with the image of murder, the innocent girl's friend sets out to take revenge on the blackmailer.

Maron - A mother cannot see the suffering of her disabled son and therefore mercy-killed him by air embolism and framed her daughter in law.

Megher Pore Megh - An extramarital affair of a rich businessman infuriated his dejected wife, after which she planned a cold blooded murder with the businessman's assistant.

Palabar Path Nei - Bidisha, a rich businessman's wife is blackmailed for her questionable past. The blackmailer turns out to be her own father-in-law and his illegitimate son. It's the first independent novel of the Mitin Masi series.

Film 
Arindam Sil, the director of the Byomkesh Bakshi and Shabor series, has completed the first Mitin Mashi film based on the story Hate Matro Tintey Din. Mitin was played by Bengali actress Koel Mallick. The film Mitin Mashi was released during 2019 Durga Puja.

References

Fictional Bengali people
Mitin Masi
Fictional private investigators
Fictional amateur detectives